Edmund Meredith "Nig" Waller (October 18, 1904 – June 4, 1988) was an American football player and coach. He served as the head football coach at Middle Tennessee State University from 1934 to 1935. He also coached basketball and baseball there from 1933 to 1935. During his two-season tenure as basketball coach at Middle Tennessee State, Waller compiled an overall record of 9–2. His football record was an overall 3–14–1. Waller played quarterback under Dan McGugin at Vanderbilt University from 1924 to 1926. He was called "Nig" due to his dark complexion. He was coach when Middle Tennessee was first dubbed the "Blue Raiders."

Prior to coaching at Middle Tennessee State University, Waller coached at Bessemer City High School in Bessemer, Alabama. In seven seasons at Bessemer, Waller went 49–11–4.

Head coaching record

College football

College basketball

References

1904 births
1988 deaths
American football quarterbacks
Middle Tennessee Blue Raiders baseball coaches
Middle Tennessee Blue Raiders football coaches
Middle Tennessee Blue Raiders men's basketball coaches
Vanderbilt Commodores football players
High school football coaches in Alabama
Sportspeople from Bessemer, Alabama
Coaches of American football from Alabama
Players of American football from Alabama
Baseball coaches from Alabama
Basketball coaches from Alabama